Godhana Dhadho Gaddae is the 2nd and current governor of Tana River County in Kenya, in office since 22 August 2017

References

Living people
Year of birth missing (living people)
Orange Democratic Movement politicians
Members of the National Assembly (Kenya)